Aragon is a Spanish autonomous community.

Aragon, or  Aragón may also refer to:

Places

The Iberian Peninsula
 County of Aragon, a medieval county in Spain 
 Kingdom of Aragon, a medieval kingdom in Spain
 Aragón (river), a tributary of the river Ebro

The United States of America
 Aragon, Georgia
 Aragon, New Mexico, the site of Fort Tularosa
 Aragon High School, in San Mateo, California

Other places
 Crown of Aragon, a Mediterranean empire during the Middle Ages
 Aragon, Aude, a commune in the Aude département, France
 Aragon, Antioquia, a place in Colombia

Ships
 Spanish cruiser Aragon, a late 19th-century warship
 HMT Aragon, a troop ship, previously the British ocean liner RMS Aragon

People
 Louis Aragon (1897–1982), French poet, novelist and editor
 Maria Aragon (born 2000), Canadian singer
 Manuel Gutiérrez Aragón (born 1940), Spanish screenwriter and film director
 Catherine of Aragon, first wife of Henry VIII
 List of Aragonese monarchs

Other uses
 "Aragon", a composition by Brian Eno on the album Music for Films

 Aragón TV, a radio and television network in Aragon
 Orquesta Aragón, Cuban musical band

Transit
 Aragón metro station, an at-grade station in Line 5 in Mexico City
 Bosque de Aragón metro station, an at-grade station in Line B in Mexico City
 Plaza Aragón metro station, an at-grade station in Ecatepec, State of Mexico
 Villa de Aragón metro station, an at-grade station in Mexico City
 Aragó, an underground Metrovalencia station

See also
 Aragon Ballroom (disambiguation)
 Aragorn, a fictional character in the novel The Lord of the Rings
 Eragon, the first book in the Inheritance Cycle series by Christopher Paolini
 Aragog, a beast in the Harry Potter series
 Aragona, an Italian commune